Natallia is a feminine given name, a variant form of Natalia.

People with this given name
Natallia Helakh (born 1978), Belarusian rower
Natallia Krauchanka (born 1988), Belarusian model and actress
Natallia Mikhnevich (born 1982), Belarusian shot putter
Natallia Safronava, née Klimovets (born 1974), Belarusian triple jumper
Natallia Safronnikava (born 1973), Belarusian sprinter
Natallia Sazanovich (born 1973), former Belarusian heptathlete
Natallia Shymchuk (born 1980), female javelin thrower from Belarus
Natallia Solohub (born 1975), Belarusian sprinter
Natallia Tryfanava, Belarusian music teacher; won the World Sauna Championships three times
Natallia Tsylinskaya (born 1975), eight times World Champion track cyclist

See also
Natalia (disambiguation)

Feminine given names